Betsy Aidem (born October 28, 1957) is an American actress who plays for film, television and stage. Her film work includes The Bleeding House, See You in the Morning, A Vigilante and Aeris. Her television work includes The High Life,  The Americans, appearing in episodes, "Safe House" and "Covert War". Her stage work includes Steel Magnolias and Five Women Wearing the Same Dress.

Background
An Obie Award winner, she first became interested in acting while she was in high school. Her debut was as a fairy in Shakespeare's A Midsummer Night's Dream. She is also a stage play director and her first professional production was in 2018, A Doll's House, Part 2., which was a stage production of the Lucas Hnath comedy.<ref>New Jersey Stage, 11/19/2018 - [https://www.newjerseystage.com/articles/2018/11/19/a-look-at-betsy-aidem-director-of-a-dolls-house-part-2-at-george-street-playhouse/ A Look At Betsy Aidem, Director of "A Doll's House, Part 2" at George Street Playhouse By Charles Paolino] </ref> She was the first wife of William Fichtner and had a child with him.

Stage work
Midway through 2009, Aidem was in Nicki Bloom's Tender, a story about an act of violence that destroys a family. The play, directed by Daniela Topol, also starred Kerry Bishe, Michael Cullen, and Matt Dellapina.
In October 2018, she appeared as the loony and flamboyant Professor Carroway in Love Course which was about two eccentric neurotics, Carroway and Professor Burgess, teaching a course in romantic literature and two students who attend the course end up teaching it.New York Theatre Guide, October 8, 2018 -  Review of Primary Stages' Final Follies at Cherry Lane Theatre - Review By: David Walters 

Film work
1980s to 1990s
Her earliest film work was in the 1982 film A Little Sex, where she played a passer-by. In 1985, she appeared in  the television film Kojak: The Belarus File as Elissa Barak.

2000s
She appeared in Sarah Daggar-Nickson's 2018 film A Vigilante which starred Olivia Wilde, Morgan Spector and Kyle Catlett. Also that year she was in Aeris, a film about a couple adopting a sick kitten.

Television shows
Her work on television shows includes reoccurring roles on The High Life as Irene,Single Season Sitcoms of the 1990s: A Complete Guide, By Bob Leszczak - Page 84 Single Season Sitcoms of the 1990s  and as Dr. Sloane on Law & Order: Special Victims Unit''.

Stage appearances

Partial filmography

References

External links

1957 births
American stage actresses
20th-century American actresses
21st-century American actresses
American theatre directors
Living people
American film actresses
American television actresses
People from East Meadow, New York
Actresses from New York (state)
Women theatre directors
Obie Award recipients